In mathematics, a diffeomorphism is an isomorphism of smooth manifolds. It is an invertible function that maps one differentiable manifold to another such that both the function and its inverse are differentiable.

Definition 

If these functions are  times continuously differentiable,   is called a -diffeomorphism.

They are -diffeomorphic if there is an  times continuously differentiable bijective map between them whose inverse is also  times continuously differentiable.

 Diffeomorphisms of subsets of manifolds 

The function  is said to be a diffeomorphism if it is bijective, smooth and its inverse is smooth.

 Local description 

 Hadamard-Caccioppoli Theorem

 First remark
For example, consider the "realification" of the complex square function 
  
Then  is surjective and it satisfies 
  
Thus, though  is bijective at each point,  is not invertible because it fails to be injective (e.g. ).

 Second remark
Since the differential at a point (for a differentiable function) 
  
is a linear map, it has a well-defined inverse if and only if  is a bijection. This so-called Jacobian matrix is often used for explicit computations.

 Third remark
Diffeomorphisms are necessarily between manifolds of the same dimension. Imagine  going from dimension  to dimension . If  then  could never be surjective, and if  then  could never be injective. In both cases, therefore,  fails to be a bijection.

 Fourth remark
If  is a bijection at  then  is said to be a local diffeomorphism (since, by continuity,  will also be bijective for all  sufficiently close to ).

 Fifth remark
Given a smooth map from dimension  to dimension , if  (or, locally) is surjective,  is said to be a submersion (or, locally, a "local submersion"); and if  (or, locally) is injective,  is said to be an immersion (or, locally, a "local immersion").

 Sixth remark
A differentiable bijection is not necessarily a diffeomorphism. This is an example of a homeomorphism that is not a diffeomorphism.

 Seventh remark
When  is a map between differentiable manifolds, a diffeomorphic  is a stronger condition than a homeomorphic . For a diffeomorphism,  and its inverse need to be differentiable; for a homeomorphism,  and its inverse need only be continuous. Every diffeomorphism is a homeomorphism, but not every homeomorphism is a diffeomorphism.

 is called a diffeomorphism if, in coordinate charts, it satisfies the definition above. The map  is then a diffeomorphism as in the definition above, whenever .

 Examples 

Since any manifold can be locally parametrised, we can consider some explicit maps from  into .

 Let 
  
 We can calculate the Jacobian matrix:
 
 The Jacobian matrix has zero determinant if and only if . We see that  could only be a diffeomorphism away from the -axis and the -axis. However,  is not bijective since , and thus it cannot be a diffeomorphism.

 Let 
  
We can calculate the Jacobian matrix at 0:
 
 We see that g is a local diffeomorphism at 0 if, and only if, 
 
 i.e. the linear terms in the components of g are linearly independent as polynomials.

 Let 
 
 We can calculate the Jacobian matrix:
 
 The Jacobian matrix has zero determinant everywhere! In fact we see that the image of h is the unit circle.

Surface deformations
In mechanics, a stress-induced transformation is called a deformation and may be described by a diffeomorphism.
A diffeomorphism  between two surfaces  and  has a Jacobian matrix  that is an invertible matrix. Suppose that in a chart of the surface, 

The total differential of u is
, and similarly for v.
Then the image  is a linear transformation, fixing the origin, and expressible as the action of a complex number of a particular type. When (dx, dy) is also interpreted as that type of complex number, the action is of complex multiplication in the appropriate complex number plane. As such, there is a type of angle (Euclidean, hyperbolic, or slope) that is preserved in such a multiplication. Due to Df being invertible, the type of complex number is uniform over the surface. Consequently, a surface deformation or diffeomorphism of surfaces has the conformal property of preserving (the appropriate type of) angles.

 Diffeomorphism group 

Let  be a differentiable manifold that is second-countable and Hausdorff. This is a "large" group, in the sense that—provided  is not zero-dimensional—it is not locally compact.

Topology
The diffeomorphism group has two natural topologies: weak and strong'' . When the manifold is compact, these two topologies agree.  The weak topology is always metrizable.  When the manifold is not compact, the strong topology captures the behavior of functions "at infinity" and is not metrizable.  It is, however, still Baire.

 
Then:
 

The diffeomorphism group equipped with its weak topology is locally homeomorphic to the space of  vector fields . If  is finite and the manifold is compact, the space of vector fields is a Banach space. Moreover, the transition maps from one chart of this atlas to another are smooth, making the diffeomorphism group into a Banach manifold with smooth right translations; left translations and inversion are only continuous. If ,  the space of vector fields is a Fréchet space. Moreover, the transition maps are smooth, making the diffeomorphism group into a Fréchet manifold and even into a regular Fréchet Lie group. If the manifold is -compact and not compact the full diffeomorphism group is not locally contractible for any of the two topologies. One has to restrict the group by controlling the deviation from the identity near infinity to obtain a diffeomorphism group which is a manifold; see .

Lie algebra
The Lie algebra of the diffeomorphism group of  consists of all vector fields on  equipped with the Lie bracket of vector fields.  Somewhat formally, this is seen by making a small change to the coordinate  at each point in space:
 
so the infinitesimal generators are the vector fields

Examples
 The diffeomorphism group of Euclidean space  consists of two components, consisting of the orientation-preserving and orientation-reversing diffeomorphisms. In fact, the general linear group is a deformation retract of the subgroup  of diffeomorphisms fixing the origin under the map .  In particular, the general linear group is also a deformation retract of the full diffeomorphism group.
 For a finite set of points, the diffeomorphism group is simply the symmetric group. Similarly, if  is any manifold there is a group extension . Moreover, the image of the map  is the bijections of  that preserve diffeomorphism classes.

Transitivity
More generally, the diffeomorphism group acts transitively on the configuration space .

Extensions of diffeomorphisms
In 1926, Tibor Radó asked whether the harmonic extension of any homeomorphism or diffeomorphism of the unit circle to the unit disc yields a diffeomorphism on the open disc. An elegant proof was provided shortly afterwards by Hellmuth Kneser. In 1945, Gustave Choquet, apparently unaware of this result, produced a completely different proof.

The (orientation-preserving) diffeomorphism group of the circle is pathwise connected. This can be seen by noting that any such diffeomorphism can be lifted to a diffeomorphism  of the reals satisfying ; this space is convex and hence path-connected. A smooth, eventually constant path to the identity gives a second more elementary way of extending a diffeomorphism from the circle to the open unit disc (a special case of the Alexander trick). Moreover, the diffeomorphism group of the circle has the homotopy-type of the orthogonal group .

The corresponding extension problem for diffeomorphisms of higher-dimensional spheres  was much studied in the 1950s and 1960s, with notable contributions from René Thom, John Milnor and Stephen Smale. An obstruction to such extensions is given by the finite abelian group , the "group of twisted spheres", defined as the quotient of the abelian component group of the diffeomorphism group by the subgroup of classes extending to diffeomorphisms of the ball .

Connectedness
For manifolds, the diffeomorphism group is usually not connected. Its component group is called the mapping class group. In dimension 2 (i.e. surfaces), the mapping class group is a finitely presented group generated by Dehn twists (Dehn, Lickorish, Hatcher). Max Dehn and Jakob Nielsen showed that it can be identified with the outer automorphism group of the fundamental group of the surface.

William Thurston refined this analysis by classifying elements of the mapping class group into three types: those equivalent to a periodic diffeomorphism; those equivalent to a diffeomorphism leaving a simple closed curve invariant; and those equivalent to pseudo-Anosov diffeomorphisms. In the case of the torus , the mapping class group is simply the modular group  and the classification becomes classical in terms of elliptic, parabolic and hyperbolic matrices. Thurston accomplished his classification by observing that the mapping class group acted naturally on a compactification of Teichmüller space; as this enlarged space was homeomorphic to a closed ball, the Brouwer fixed-point theorem became applicable. Smale conjectured that if  is an oriented smooth closed manifold, the identity component of the group of orientation-preserving diffeomorphisms is simple. This had first been proved for a product of circles by Michel Herman; it was proved in full generality by Thurston.

Homotopy types
 The diffeomorphism group of  has the homotopy-type of the subgroup . This was proven by Steve Smale. 
 The diffeomorphism group of the torus has the homotopy-type of its linear automorphisms: .
 The diffeomorphism groups of orientable surfaces of genus  have the homotopy-type of their mapping class groups (i.e. the components are contractible).
 The homotopy-type of the diffeomorphism groups of 3-manifolds are fairly well understood via the work of Ivanov, Hatcher, Gabai and Rubinstein, although there are a few outstanding open cases (primarily 3-manifolds with finite fundamental groups).
For example, it is an open problem whether or not  has more than two components. Via Milnor, Kahn and Antonelli, however, it is known that provided ,  does not have the homotopy-type of a finite CW-complex.

Homeomorphism and diffeomorphism 
Since every diffeomorphism is a homeomorphism, given a pair of manifolds which are diffeomorphic to each other they are in particular homeomorphic to each other. The converse is not true in general. 

While it is easy to find homeomorphisms that are not diffeomorphisms, it is more difficult to find a pair of homeomorphic manifolds that are not diffeomorphic. In dimensions 1, 2 and 3, any pair of homeomorphic smooth manifolds are diffeomorphic. In dimension 4 or greater, examples of homeomorphic but not diffeomorphic pairs exist. The first such example was constructed by John Milnor in dimension 7. He constructed a smooth 7-dimensional manifold (called now Milnor's sphere) that is homeomorphic to the standard 7-sphere but not diffeomorphic to it. There are, in fact, 28 oriented diffeomorphism classes of manifolds homeomorphic to the 7-sphere (each of them is the total space of a fiber bundle over the 4-sphere with the 3-sphere as the fiber).

More unusual phenomena occur for 4-manifolds.

See also 
 Anosov diffeomorphism such as Arnold's cat map
 Diffeo anomaly also known as a gravitational anomaly, a type anomaly in quantum mechanics
 Diffeology, smooth parameterizations on a set, which makes a diffeological space
 Diffeomorphometry, metric study of shape and form in computational anatomy
 Étale morphism
 Large diffeomorphism
 Local diffeomorphism
 Superdiffeomorphism

Notes

References 
 
 
 
 
 
 
 
 
 
 
 
 

 
Mathematical physics